Abbenes is a village in the Dutch province of North Holland.

The village was first mentioned in 1867 as Abbenes, and is named after a lost island. The name means "headland of Abe (person)". Abbenes developed shortly after 1852 on the Hoofdvaart near a bridge.

References

Populated places in North Holland
Haarlemmermeer